Olympic Club, commonly known as Olympic, or as Olympic de Barbacena is a Brazilian football club based in Barbacena, Minas Gerais state.

History
The club was founded on July 25, 1915. Olympic won the Campeonato Mineiro Segunda Divisão in 2004, beating Patrocinense in the final.

Achievements

 Campeonato Mineiro Segunda Divisão:
 Winners (1): 2004

Stadium
Olympic Club play their home games at Estádio Santa Tereza. The stadium has a maximum capacity of 5,000 people.

References

Association football clubs established in 1915
Football clubs in Minas Gerais
1915 establishments in Brazil
Barbacena